Stefan Chaput (born March 11, 1988) is a Canadian former professional ice hockey centre who played in the American Hockey League (AHL).

Playing career
Chaput played his junior hockey in the Quebec Major Junior Hockey League for the Lewiston Maineiacs. Drafted by the Carolina Hurricanes 153rd overall in the 2006 NHL Entry Draft he was signed to an entry level contract with the Hurricanes on April 16, 2008.

After starting the 2010–11 season with Carolina's AHL affiliate, the Charlotte Checkers, on November 23, 2010, Chaput was traded from the Hurricanes to the Anaheim Ducks, along with Matt Kennedy, in exchange for Ryan Carter. He was then immediately assigned to remain in the AHL with the Syracuse Crunch. After 27 games with the Crunch, Chaput was again traded by the Ducks along with David Laliberte to the Boston Bruins in exchange for Brian McGrattan and Sean Zimmerman on February 27, 2011.

On September 18, 2012, Chaput was signed to a one-year deal with the Hamilton Bulldogs of the AHL.

On November 14, 2013, Chaput signed a professional tryout contract (PTO) with the Utica Comets of the AHL after starting the season with the Cornwall River Kings of the semi-professional LNAH. Chaput played three games with the Comets before departing for Europe in signing for the remainder of the season with DEL2 club, Ravensburg Towerstars.

On July 16, 2014, Chaput opted to remain in Germany, signing a contract with DEL2 rival, Dresdner Eislöwen. He assumed a role on Dresdner's top scoring line and completed his one-year tenure in the 2014–15 season, with 54 points in 43 games.

As a free agent on August 17, 2015, Chaput signed in the neighbouring Austrian EBEL, in agreeing to a one-year deal with Slovenian club, HDD Olimpija Ljubljana.

In the last two seasons of his playing career, Chaput returned to Canada, playing with Jonquière Marquis of the Ligue Nord-Américaine de Hockey (LNAH).

Personal life
His younger brother, Michael Chaput, currently plays for the Arizona Coyotes, and his father, Alain, once served as governor for the now-defunct Lewiston Maineiacs franchise .

Career statistics

Regular season and playoffs

International

References

External links

1988 births
Living people
Albany River Rats players
Canadian ice hockey centres
Canadian expatriate ice hockey players in Slovenia
Carolina Hurricanes draft picks
Charlotte Checkers (2010–) players
Dresdner Eislöwen players
Hamilton Bulldogs (AHL) players
HDD Olimpija Ljubljana players
Lewiston Maineiacs players
Löwen Frankfurt players
Ice hockey people from Montreal
Providence Bruins players
Ravensburg Towerstars players
Syracuse Crunch players
Utica Comets players
Wheeling Nailers players